Progona venata is a moth in the subfamily Arctiinae. It was described by Schaus in 1921. It is found in Paraguay.

References

Natural History Museum Lepidoptera generic names catalog

Moths described in 1921
Lithosiini